Torchwood – The Official Magazine was a British magazine devoted to the BBC science fiction television series Torchwood. The first issue was released on 24 January 2008 and concluded on 16 December 2010 The United States version was due to be launched in February 2008. Titan Magazines announced in Issue 24 that the next issue would be the last for a while.

Content
The magazine includes the latest news from the Torchwood set, cast and crew interviews, behind-the-scenes features on the show's special effects, and ten pages of original Torchwood comic strip fiction. The first few issues featured regular columns from Torchwood lead writer Chris Chibnall and producer Richard Stokes. Issue 8 saw the introduction of an original piece of short prose every month. Issue 14 saw the magazine become a bi-monthly production with a larger page count. Issue 25 will be the final issue.

Comic strips

Other than Issue 2, every issue of the Magazine has included a comic strip.

Issue 1 – "The Legacy of Torchwood One"
Issue 3 – "Jetsam" (Reprinted as part of the Graphic Novel "Rift War")
Issues 4, 5, 6, 7, 8, 9, 10, 11, 12 & 13 – "Rift War" (Reprinted in Graphic Novel "Rift War")
Issue 14 – "The Selkie" (Co-written By John Barrowman and his sister Carole)
Issues 15, 16, 17, 18 & 19 – "Broken"
Issue 20 – "Fated to Pretend"
Issues 21 & 22 – "Shrouded"
Issue 23 – "Somebody Else's Problem"
Issue 24 – "Hell House"
Issue 25 – "Overture"

Short stories
A short piece of fiction has been included in every issue since Issue 8. The Torchwood Magazine Yearbooks, published in 2008 and 2009, contained a further six exclusive short stories.

Issues 8, 9 & 10 – "Harm's Way" Written by Trevor Baxendale, illustrated by Mike Dowling
Issues 11, 12 & 13 – "The Book of Jahi" Written by David Llewellyn, illustrated by Mike Dowling
Issues 14 & 15 – "Gordian" Written by Steven Savile, illustrated by Mike Dowling
Issues 16 & 17 – "Closing Time" Written by Andy Lane, illustrated by Mike Dowling
Issue 20 – "Happy New Year" Written by Sarah Pinborough
Issue 22 – "Ashes to Ashes" Written by Sandra Shennan
Issue 23 – "Mend Me" Written by Sarah Pinborough
Yearbook 2008 – "Black Water" by Steven Savile, "Mrs Acres" by David Llewellyn, "The Beauty of Our Weapons" by Andy Lane, "Plant Life" by Trevor Baxendale and "Monster" by Joseph Lidster.
Yearbook 2009 – "The Book Jahi" by David Llewellyn

See also
Doctor Who Magazine

References

2008 establishments in the United Kingdom
2010 disestablishments in the United Kingdom
Bi-monthly magazines published in the United Kingdom
Defunct science fiction magazines published in the United Kingdom
Defunct magazines published in the United Kingdom
Doctor Who magazines
Magazines established in 2008
Magazines disestablished in 2010
Titan Magazines titles
Magazine